León Errázuriz (born 23 July in Santiago, Chile) is a filmmaker now based in Los Angeles, USA.

He is earned a degree in Economics at the Catholic University of Chile 1991, and also studied for a few years at the Centro Universitario de Estudios Cinematográficos of the UNAM Mexican film school. Back in Chile he directed many commercials spots and his first feature film Mala Leche in late 2004, winning the Horizons Award at the 52 San Sebastián International Film Festival.

Awards 
 Altazor Awards: Best Director Drama Television with Huaquimán y Tolosa - 2007
 New York LaCinemaFe: Honorable Mention with Mala leche - (35mm,100 minutes) - 2005
 Gramado Film Festival: Nominated with Mala leche - (35mm,100 minutes) -2005
 Festival Cinesul Brasil: Won with Mala leche - (35mm,100 minutes) -2005
 San Sebastián International Film Festival: Won Horizons Awards with Mala leche(35mm,100 minutes)- 2004
 1999–2003 in two occasions he obtained awards from ACHAP (Chilean National Association of Advertising)

Filmography as director 
 2010 - Letter of Consuelo / a historical TV film about Land Reform in Chile (1971–1973) (Chilevision)
 2010 - Free Falling Atacama / Feature Film (Director, Script, Edition)
 2009 - The Goatherd / Feature Film (Director, Script, Edition)
 2007 - Caméra Café / Director Pilot Chile / Serie TV (4K)
 2007 - Che Kopete la película/ Feature Film (Director).
 2006 - Huaiquimán y Tolosa  private detectives (Police comedy) / Serie TV (canal 13) (director, original idea) :es:Huaiquimán y Tolosa
 2004 - Mala leche / Feature Film (Director, script, executive production, Edition)

with his production company Cine FX he Co-produce Paraíso B (2002), Sexo con amor (2003), Jemeaux (2003) y Huaiquimán y Tolosa Investigadores privados / Serie TV(2006).

External links
 
 Vimeo
 León Errázuriz en Youtube
 León Errázuriz Mala Leche
 Altazor
 San Sebastian
 Jaman

                   

1968 births
Living people
Chilean film directors
American film directors
People from Santiago
Pontifical Catholic University of Chile alumni